Rangga Nattra is an Indonesian actor and director. He was born on July 18, 1989. He started his career as an announcer at one of Bali radio station. After that, in 2011 Rangga moved to Jakarta to host several TV programs.

After taking a break, Rangga started to learn more about directing as he had interest in it. His first work as director was the sitcom of the Keluarga Ben Ben (2016). Then Rangga started to direct several movies, for instance Ngawur (2017), Kasih Ibu (2019) which being played at the 2019 Balinale Film Festival, Xtra Absurd (2019), and Pencitraan (2019). His first appearance as an actor in a movie was as Rahmat in the Darah Daging (2019) along with Ario Bayu. In 2020 he will be acting in two movies, Nona and Demi Waktu, a movie about Lafran Pane biography.

Filmography 

 Keluarga Ben Ben (Director, 2016)
 Ngawur (Director, 2017)
 Kasih Ibu (Actor, Director 2019)
 Xtra Absurd (Director, 2019)
 Pencitraan (Director, 2019)
 Darah Daging (Actor, 2019)
 Nona (Actor, 2020)
 Demi Waktu (Actor, 2020)

References 

Indonesian male film actors
Indonesian film directors
Living people
1989 births